Robert or Bobby Dodd may refer to:

 Robert Dodd (baseball) (born 1973), American baseball player
 Robert Dodd (artist) (1748–1815), British marine painter
 Robert Dodd (footballer), English association footballer
 Robert F. Dodd (1844–1903), Canadian soldier who fought in the American Civil War
 Bobby Dodd (1908–1988), American football coach